Joseph Elsner (29 September 1845 in Schlaney, Silesia – 3 March 1933 in Munich) was a German architect and designer of Historicism (art).

Elsner's work focused mainly on the interior of Catholic churches in Munich, Bavaria, and in his home region, Silesia.
In 1876 he married Walburga Hauser (1857–1924). They had 13 children, six of whom died as infants or toddlers.

His son,  (1879–1970), was also an architect.

Sources 
 Hildegard Berning: Joseph Elsner (1845−1933). In: Joachim Bahlcke (Ed.): Schlesische Lebensbilder. Vol.9. Insingen 2007. , pp.293–304
 Verein für christliche Kunst in München: Festgabe zur Erinnerung an das 50jähr. Jubiläum. Lentner'sche Hofbuchhandlung, München 1910, pg.150

External links 

 

1845 births
1933 deaths
19th-century German architects
People from the Province of Silesia